The 1852 Florida gubernatorial election was held on October 4, 1852. Democratic nominee James E. Broome defeated the Whig nominee George T. Ward.

The Election was only decided by the slim margin of 211 votes.

General election

Candidates

Democratic 

 James E . Broome

Whig 

 George T. Ward

Results

Results by County

See also 

 1852 United States presidential election in Florida
 1852 United States House of Representatives election in Florida

References 

1852 Florida elections
Florida
Florida gubernatorial elections